West Africans in the United States are Americans with ancestry from West Africa. They include:

 Beninese Americans
 Burkinabé Americans
 Cape Verdean Americans
 Chadian Americans
 Gambian Americans
 Ghanaian Americans
 Guinean Americans
 Guinea-Bissauan Americans
 Ivorian Americans
 Liberian Americans
 Malian Americans
 Mauritanian Americans
 Nigerien Americans
 Nigerian Americans
 Igbo Americans
 Yoruba Americans
 Senegalese Americans
 Sierra Leonean Americans
 Togolese Americans

In addition, they include a majority of African-American people, whose ancestors were sourced largely from West African states via the Atlantic slave trade.

See also
West Africa